Romeo's Daughter are a British AOR, contemporary and mainstream rock band. Their lineup features Leigh Matty, Craig Joiner and Andy Wells. The band released two albums in 1988 and 1993 respectively. They then reformed in 2009 and have toured extensively, as well as releasing new material: a live EP of past hits and an album of new material Rapture in 2012. and "Spin" in 2015. The current line-up is Leigh Matty, Craig Joiner, Stephen Drennan and Andy Wells. John Victor "Rhino" Edwards from Status Quo is a regular guest with the band live.

History
The original manager of the band was Olga Lange, then the wife of Robert John "Mutt" Lange. Mutt Lange was impressed by their songwriting abilities and agreed to produce (part of) their debut album. Hence, Romeo's Daughter was often seen as protégés of Mutt Lange.

The first album contained the singles "Don't Break My Heart", "I Cry Myself to Sleep at Night", covered by Bonnie Tyler and Chrissy Steele and "Heaven in the Back Seat", the latter from the A Nightmare on Elm Street 5: The Dream Child soundtrack.  The album was produced by Mutt Lange and John Parr.  "Wild Child" (written by Mutt Lange) was later covered by Heart on the Brigade album, and "Heaven in the Back Seat" was covered by Eddie Money on his 1991 album, Right Here.

The second album, Delectable was a more mature affair, although it was released on the smaller Music for Nations label so got less exposure.  Mitman went on to work with FM and other bands while the band broke up in the mid 1990s.

On 25 February 2008, Romeo's Daughter's first studio album was reissued by Rock Candy Records on CD with bonus material, a 16-page full colour booklet with original and new artwork, etc. After this reissue Romeo's Daughter reformed and were performing shows. These appearances included a small warm up gig on 13 October 2009, and their main event of 2009 was Firefest VI at Nottingham Rock City on 24 October 2009.

In 2009, the band announced that they would be releasing new material through Riff City Records in the "near future". The band played some dates during 2010 and performed new material. The band's second album, Delectable, was reissued in July 2011.

On 22 October 2011, Romeo's Daughter released a three-track live EP available via download sites such as iTunes. In March 2012, the band released their first new album in 19 years, Rapture and during 2012 they performed more live tour dates. In 2012, lead singer, Leigh Matty, was voted Number 5 Lady Rock Singer of all time in Classic Rock and their single 'Bittersweet' was in their 'Top songs of 2012' chart. During 2013, the band toured the UK and performed at festivals including Fairport's Cropredy Convention and Hard Rock Hell.

A live album and DVD filmed live at Derby Guildhall was released in 2014. In 2015, the band released another album of new music titled Spin, which they toured Europe to promote.

Romeo's Daughter are managed by Juliet Sharman Matthews at JPSM Management who worked with them at Jive Records.

Members

Current
 Leigh Matty - lead vocals
 Craig Joiner - guitar
 Stephen Drennan - bass 
 Andy Wells - drums

Former
 Paul King - drums
 Anthony "Tony, Slim" Mitman - keyboards
 Jeff Knowler - keyboards
 Ed Poole - Bass

Discography

Albums
 Romeo's Daughter (1988)
 Delectable (1993)
 Rapture (2012)
 Spin (2015)

Singles
 "Don't Break My Heart" (1988) US No. 73
 "I Cry Myself to Sleep at Night" (1988)
 "Heaven in the Back Seat" (1989) UK No. 97
 "Attracted to the Animal" (1993)
 "Bittersweet" (2012)
 "Alive" (2013)

Live albums
 Live EP (2011)
 Alive (2014)

Contributions to soundtracks
 A Nightmare on Elm Street 5: The Dream Child soundtrack (1989)

References

External links
 RomeosDaughter.co.uk Official band website

Musical groups established in 1988
British rock music groups
Jive Records artists